Al-Shafuniyah also spelled Al-Shifuniyah and Shafuniyeh, is a Syrian village located in the Douma District of Rif Dimashq. According to the Syria Central Bureau of Statistics (CBS), Al-Shafuniyah had a population of 2,953 in the 2004 census.

References

Populated places in Markaz Rif Dimashq District